Avcom - Aviones Comerciales de Guatemala is an charter airline based in Guatemala City, Guatemala. It was established in 1954, and it operates domestic charter services and was associated with Grupo TACA. Its main base is La Aurora International Airport.

Fleet
The fleet of Avcom consisted of the following aircraft (as of March 2007):

5 DHC-6 Twin Otter Series 300
1 De Havilland Canada Dash 7
4 Aero Commander 500

Accidents and incidents
On February 16, 1996 - a DHC-6 Twin Otter Series 300 (registered TG-JAK), was on a ferry flight from Guatemala City to Cancábal crashed. On approach, the captain descended into the clouds below MDA. The aircraft contacted with trees and crashed, killing the 2  occupants on board.

See also
List of airlines of Guatemala

References

Airlines established in 1954
1954 establishments in Guatemala